P320 may refer to:
 Athlon II X2 P320, an eighth-generation CPU targeted at the consumer market
 SIG Sauer P320, a semi-automatic pistol